Isabella de Almeida Fernandes (born 18 December 1999), simply known as Isabella, is a Brazilian footballer who plays as a right back for Campeonato Brasileiro de Futebol Feminino Série A1 club SE Palmeiras and the Brazil women's national team.

References

1999 births
Living people
Footballers from São Paulo
Brazilian women's footballers
Women's association football fullbacks
Brazil women's international footballers
Sociedade Esportiva Palmeiras (women) players